Martin Knakal (born 17 April 1984) is a Czech football defender, currently playing for FK Baník Sokolov. He made over 50 appearances in the Gambrinus liga. He played international football at youth level for his country including eight matches and one goal for Czech Republic U21.

References

External links

1984 births
Living people
Czech footballers
Czech Republic youth international footballers
Czech Republic under-21 international footballers
Czech First League players
FC Viktoria Plzeň players
Xanthi F.C. players
SK Sigma Olomouc players
Bohemians 1905 players
1. FK Příbram players
FK Baník Most players
FK Baník Sokolov players
Association football defenders